The British Rail Class 128 was a class of diesel multiple unit, built for British Rail. Introduced in 1959, ten of the class were built by Gloucester Railway Carriage and Wagon Company, each with two 230 hp British United Traction - Albion engines. The class was built specifically for parcels, fitted out with parcel racks and bike storage at each end, and did not feature any passenger accommodation. The last members of the class were withdrawn in 1990 and broken up the following year, and none were preserved.

Numbering

Livery

Operation
Introduced in 1959, the Class 128s were given the TOPS classification DXV in 1973. By 1978, the initial unit M55987 had been withdrawn, and four of the six units originally intended for use on the Western Region had moved to the Midland Region.

Models

Heljan have produced a 00 scale model in British Railways all over green, Rail Blue and Royal Mail Post Office Red liveries, although these only represent the later version with corridor connection. By 2021 these models were no longer in production.

In 2018, Revolution Trains announced that they are to produce six different variants of the Class 128 in N gauge covering BR green, Rail Blue and RES Red liveries.

References

Sources

External links

Class info from railcar.co.uk 

128
Gloucester multiple units
Non-passenger multiple units
Train-related introductions in 1959